A turbo generator is an electric generator connected to the shaft of a steam turbine or gas turbine for the generation of electric power. Large steam-powered turbo generators provide the majority of the world's electricity and are also used by steam-powered turbo-electric ships.

Small turbo-generators driven by gas turbines are often used as auxiliary power units (APU, mainly for aircraft).

History

The first turbo-generators were electric generators powered by water turbines. The first Hungarian water turbine was designed by the engineers of the Ganz Works in 1866; industrial-scale production with dynamo generators started only in 1883. Engineer Charles Algernon Parsons demonstrated a DC steam-powered turbo generator using a dynamo in 1887, and by 1901 had supplied the first large industrial AC turbo generator of megawatt power to a plant in Eberfeld, Germany.

Turbo generators were also used on steam locomotives as a power source for coach lighting and water pumps for heating systems.

Construction features 
Turbo generators are used for high shaft rotational speeds, typical of steam and gas turbines. The rotor of a turbo generator is a non-salient pole type usually with two poles.

The normal speed of a turbo generator is 1500 or 3000 rpm with four or two poles at 50 Hz (1800 or 3600 rpm with four or two poles at 60 Hz).  The rotating parts of a turbo generator are subjected to high mechanical stresses because of the high operation speed. To make the rotor mechanically resistant in large turbo-alternators, the rotor is normally forged from solid steel and alloys like chromium-nickel-steel or chromium-nickel-molybdenum are used. The overhang of windings at the periphery will be secured by steel retaining rings. Heavy non-magnetic metal wedges on top of the slots hold the field windings against centrifugal forces. Hard composition insulating materials, like mica and asbestos, are normally used in the slots of rotor. These material can withstand high temperatures and high crushing forces.

The stator of large turbo generators may be built of two or more parts while in smaller turbo-generators it is built up in one complete piece.

Hydrogen-cooled turbo generator

Based on the air-cooled turbo generator, gaseous hydrogen first went into service as the coolant in a hydrogen-cooled turbo generator in October 1937, at  the Dayton Power & Light Co. in Dayton, Ohio. Hydrogen is used as the coolant in the rotor and sometimes the stator, allowing an increase in specific utilization and a 99.0% efficiency. Because of the high thermal conductivity, high specific heat and low density of hydrogen gas, this is the most common type in its field today. The hydrogen can be manufactured on-site by electrolysis.

The generator is hermetically sealed to prevent escape of the hydrogen gas. The absence of oxygen in the atmosphere within significantly reduces the damage of the windings' insulation by eventual corona discharges. The hydrogen gas is circulated within the rotor enclosure, and cooled by a gas-to-water heat exchanger.

See also
Alternator
Thermal power station

Notes

References

External links
Small Turbo-generator for DG & Hybrids

Electrical generators
Turbines